The 68th Golden Globe Awards were broadcast live from the Beverly Hilton Hotel in Beverly Hills, California on January 16, 2011, by NBC. The host was Ricky Gervais. The nominations were announced on December 14, 2010, by Josh Duhamel, Katie Holmes and Blair Underwood. Robert De Niro was presented with the Cecil B. DeMille Award for lifetime achievement in motion pictures. The Social Network won four awards, the most of any film, including best drama. It beat British historical tale The King's Speech, which had entered the awards ceremony with the most nominations, but collected just one award.

Winners and nominees

These are the nominees for the 68th Golden Globe Awards. Winners are listed at the top of each list.

Film

Television

Awards breakdown
The following films and programs received multiple nominations:

Film

Television

The following films and programs received multiple wins:

Films

Television

Ceremony

Presenters
 Tim Allen
 Alec Baldwin
 Halle Berry
 Justin Bieber
 Matt Bomer
 Julie Bowen
 Jeff Bridges
 Sandra Bullock
 Steve Carell
 Kaley Cuoco
 Matt Damon
 Michael Douglas
 Robert Downey Jr.
 Zac Efron
 Chris Evans
 Jimmy Fallon
 Jane Fonda
 Megan Fox
 Andrew Garfield
 Joseph Gordon-Levitt
 Tom Hanks
 Garrett Hedlund
 Chris Hemsworth
 Jeremy Irons
 Scarlett Johansson
 January Jones
 Milla Jovovich
 Alicia Keys
 LL Cool J
 Eva Longoria
 Jennifer Lopez
 Leighton Meester
 Helen Mirren
 Julianne Moore
 Robert Pattison
 Michelle Pfeiffer
 Geoffrey Rush
 Kevin Spacey
 Sylvester Stallone
 Hailee Steinfeld
 Tilda Swinton
 Blair Underwood
 Olivia Wilde
 Vanessa Williams
 Bruce Willis

Cecil B. DeMille Award
Robert De Niro

Miss Golden Globe
Gia Mantegna (daughter of Joe Mantegna & Arlene Mantegna)

Criticism
The three nominations for The Tourist were criticized since the film previously received negative reviews from critics and was nominated in the Musical or Comedy categories despite the fact that it was sold as a thriller film. The nominations for Burlesque, another film with bad reviews, also received outrage after news surfaced that the film's distributor, Sony, had treated Golden Globe voters to an all-expenses-paid trip to Las Vegas, culminating in a concert by Cher, one of the film's stars.

Ricky Gervais's job as host was also met with criticism regarding his roasting of the stars in attendance particularly Mel Gibson, Robert Downey Jr., Bruce Willis, and Angelina Jolie. The Hollywood Foreign Press Association even wrote, "his blunt one-liners targeting big-name celebrities caused anger and resentment in some quarters."

See also
 Hollywood Foreign Press Association
 83rd Academy Awards
 63rd Primetime Emmy Awards
 62nd Primetime Emmy Awards
 17th Screen Actors Guild Awards
 64th British Academy Film Awards
 31st Golden Raspberry Awards
 65th Tony Awards
 2010 in film
 2010 in American television

References

External links

068
2010 film awards
2010 television awards
Golden Globe
January 2011 events in the United States